LT Group, Inc. is a publicly listed holding company of Chinese Filipino business tycoon Lucio C. Tan in the Philippines. LT Group, Inc. is majority-owned by Tangent Holdings Corporation, its ultimate parent company (also controlled by Tan).

History
LT Group, Inc. (LTG) was incorporated on May 25, 1937, as The Manila Wine Merchants, Inc. (TMWMI). On November 17, 1947, TMWMI was listed in the Philippine Stock Exchange (PSE). On September 22, 1995, the Securities and Exchange Commission (SEC) approved the company's name change to Asian Pacific Equity Corporation (APEC) as well as the change of its role from a merchant to a holding company. On November 10, 1999, the corporate name was again changed to Tanduay Holdings, Inc (THI), and again on November 20, 2012, to its current name, LT Group, Inc. (LTG).

Acquisitions
On July 8, 1999, as Asian Pacific Equity Corporation, the company acquired 100% ownership of Twin Ace Holdings (Tanduay) in a stock swap. On July 30, 1999, Twin Ace Holdings changed its name to Tanduay Distillers, Inc.

Since 2012, the company began a series of consolidation of assets belonging to Tan by acquiring interests in Asia Brewery, Inc., Fortune Tobacco Corporation, Eton Properties Philippines, Inc. (Paramount LandEquities, Inc. and Saturn Land Holdings, Inc.), Philippine National Bank, Allied Banking Corporation and Victorias Milling Company.

Companies

Air transport
 Philippine Airlines - 9.5% ownership by ANA Holdings
 PAL Express (Air Philippines Corporation)

Banking
 Philippine National Bank (merger of Philippine National Bank and Allied Banking Corporation)

Education
 University of the East

Food & beverage
 Asia Brewery
 Tanduay Distillers, Inc.
 Absolute Distillers

Hotels
 Maranaw Hotels and Resort Corporation
 Century Park Hotel

Real estate
 Eton Properties Philippines
 Eton Centris
 Eton City

Tobacco & alcohol
 Asian Alcohol Corporation
 Fortune Tobacco Corporation (FTC)
 PMFTC, Inc. - 50% ownership by FTC

Others
 Allianz-PNB Life Insurance Inc. - Life insurance company. Allianz restarted its operations in 2016 under an exclusive partnership with the Philippine National Bank.
 MacroAsia Corporation - is one of the leading providers of aviation-related support services in the Philippines.
 Victorias Milling Company - minority ownership and management control

References

External links
 

Conglomerate companies of the Philippines
Holding companies of the Philippines
Drink companies of the Philippines
Banks of the Philippines
Real estate companies of the Philippines
Companies listed on the Philippine Stock Exchange
Companies based in Bonifacio Global City
Philippine brands
Holding companies established in 1937
Philippine companies established in 1937
1940s initial public offerings